Chakan: The Forever Man is a Sega Mega Drive/Genesis and Game Gear video game published by Sega of America during December 8, 1992. The game featured an uncommonly dark premise for the time of its release, which saw the home console market flooded with licensed platformers based on family-friendly media.

It is based upon a comic book of the same name by Robert A. Kraus and was produced by Ed Annunziata, who met Chakans creator at a convention and was impressed. In addition to composing, Chakan is also composer Mark Miller's only work as a gameplay and level designer.

Gameplay
The player, as Chakan, starts in a central hub stage, from which he can select one of four elemental-based "planes" of Earth, Air, Fire and Water, each with three levels. The player advances through each platforming level until completion or death, whereupon Chakan is returned to the hub to choose a new level on either the same or a different plane. The player has infinite lives, but will be returned to the hub if he is "killed". At the bottom of the screen, an hourglass indicates how much time the player has to complete all the levels in the plane. If time runs out, the player is returned to the hub and must restart the plane from its first level. Chakan starts out with his characteristic twin swords, but acquires a new weapon in the first stage of each element, such as the Grappling Hook which allows him to latch on to hooks and climb, and the Hammer which can break through certain walls. Chakan can also collect potions in each of the four elements, which he can combine and use to grant himself temporary powers such as enhancing his swords with elemental powers or increasing his jump height.

Upon defeating the three levels and the enemy bosses for each plane, Chakan clears the "terrestrial plane" and embarks upon a quest to defeat four "elemental planes of evil," each consisting of another three levels and a boss each for fire, earth, wind and water. These levels are considerably harder than the initial four sets of planes.

Plot 
The game follows the tale of Chakan, a warrior who is so confident in his swordsmanship that he declares even Death cannot best him in battle. Death appears and challenges Chakan: if Chakan can defeat him, he will be granted eternal life. However, if Death wins, he will become Death's eternal servant. The battle rages on for several days until Chakan emerges as the victor. Death grants him his reward, but additionally condemns him to wander all of existence until all supernatural evil is destroyed.

After he has slain the supernatural evils of Earth, Chakan is shown stabbing himself with his sword in anticipation of his promised death. Death replies that every star in the universe contains a planet filled with supernatural evil, so Chakan's curse remains unlifted. The player is given a single attempt to defeat one such cosmic supernatural evil as a final boss in the game; if unsuccessful, Chakan states that "rest will come another day". If Chakan defeats the boss, an hourglass background used in the plot exposition screens appears without any text, and after fifteen minutes a single line of text appears saying "Not the end".

Reception 

The game is well known for its unusually high difficulty level, but still retains a dedicated, if small, cult following. Sega Pro magazine gave the game an overall score of 76/100, praising the game's graphics as "well animated sprites [and] the backgrounds are detailed and atmospheric" and the game music as "deep, booming and atmospheric", concluding, "This could've been a classic game based on a novel scenario, but it's let down by the complete lack of action." Mega Action gave the game an overall score of 88%, describing the game as an "excellent mix of cutesy and platform ingredients".

Related games 
A Game Gear game by the same name was published by Sega. It features very similar gameplay, but different level layouts and other changes to accommodate the weaker hardware. It does have a title screen synthesized voice: "Chakan, the Forever Man" which the Genesis version did not.

A sequel was planned and developed somewhat by Ed Annunziata's studio AndNow, but no new information about the project has been released since 2001. It was planned to be released for as many current platforms as possible, according to Ed Annunziata himself in an interview during May 2001.

Some Legacy of Kain fans have claimed that much of the work on the Chakan sequel was later absorbed into the 2002 game Blood Omen 2, although this is unconfirmed and the only concrete link between the games is the presence of director Steve Ross. Ross and colleague Jon Miller both publicly attributed the similarities to a common look of Ross' work than any intentional reuse.

References

External links 
 RAK Graphics' official website

1992 video games
Video games based on comics
Game Gear games
Sega Genesis games
Sega video games
Video games developed in the United States
Cancelled Dreamcast games
Platform games
Single-player video games